Jarintorn Dangpiam (born 11 July 1974) is a Thai sports shooter. She competed in two events at the 1996 Summer Olympics.

References

External links
 

1974 births
Living people
Jarintorn Dangpiam
Jarintorn Dangpiam
Shooters at the 1996 Summer Olympics
Place of birth missing (living people)
Jarintorn Dangpiam
Jarintorn Dangpiam
Jarintorn Dangpiam
Asian Games medalists in shooting
Shooters at the 1994 Asian Games
Shooters at the 1998 Asian Games
Medalists at the 1994 Asian Games
Medalists at the 1998 Asian Games
Jarintorn Dangpiam